Seba (Sewa) is a Bantu language of DR Congo.

References

Sabi languages
Languages of the Democratic Republic of the Congo